This Mournable Body is a novel by Tsitsi Dangarembga which was published by Faber and Faber on 16 January 2020.

Awards 

PEN Pinter Prize
Shortlisted for 2020 Booker Prize

Critical reception and reviews 
This Mournable Body is described by Alexandra Fuller of The New York Times as "another masterpiece" and Novuyo Rosa Tshuma of The Guardian said it as "magnificent ... another classic". It has been reviewed by Kirkus Reviews, Red Pepper, The Times, The Masters Review, The Times Literary Supplement, The Daily Telegraph, Literary Review, Verve, Washington Independent Review of Books, Star Tribune, Radio New Zealand, SciELO, World Literature Today, The Straits Times, The Michigan Daily, Chicago Tribune, The Irish Times, Daily Trust, The Wire, The New Yorker, Zyzzyva, Publishers Weekly and The Gazette.

References 

Books by Tsitsi Dangarembga
2020 novels